The AVC qualification for the 2006 FIVB Volleyball Men's World Championship saw member nations compete for five places at the finals in Japan.

Draw
21 AVC national teams entered qualification. (Saudi Arabia later withdrew) The teams were distributed according to their position in the FIVB Senior Men's Rankings as of 15 January 2004 using the serpentine system for their distribution. (Rankings shown in brackets) Teams ranked 1–6 did not compete in the first round, and automatically qualified for the second round.

First round

Second round

Playoff round

First round

Pool A
Venue:  Maktoum Bin Mohamed Stadium, Dubai, United Arab Emirates
Dates: May 28–June 2, 2005
All times are Gulf Standard Time (UTC+04:00)

|}

|}

Pool B
Venue:  Ratchaburi Gymnasium, Ratchaburi, Thailand
Dates: May 20–22, 2005
All times are Indochina Time (UTC+07:00)

|}

|}

Pool C
Venue:  University of San Carlos Gymnasium, Cebu City, Philippines
Dates: March 2–6, 2005
All times are Philippine Standard Time (UTC+08:00)

|}

|}

Second round

Pool D
Venue:  Baluan Sholak Palace of Culture and Sports, Almaty, Kazakhstan
Dates: June 17–19, 2005
All times are Almaty Time (UTC+06:00)

|}

|}

Pool E
Venue:  Jawaharlal Nehru Indoor Stadium, Chennai, India
Dates: June 24–26, 2005
All times are Indian Standard Time (UTC+05:30)

|}

|}

Pool F
Venue:  Azadi Volleyball Hall, Tehran, Iran
Dates: June 22–24, 2005
All times are Iran Daylight Time (UTC+04:30)

|}

|}

Playoff round
Venue:  Jawaharlal Nehru Indoor Stadium, Chennai, India
Dates: July 1–3, 2005
All times are Indian Standard Time (UTC+05:30)

|}

|}

References

External links
 2006 World Championship Qualification

2006 FIVB Volleyball Men's World Championship
2005 in volleyball